Soharin Rural District is in Qareh Poshtelu District of Zanjan County, Zanjan province, Iran. Its constituent villages were separated from Qareh Poshtelu-e Bala Rural District by decree on 5 July 2013 to form the new rural district. At the most recent census of 2016, the population of the rural district was 6,349 in 1,949 households. The largest of its 16 villages was Soharin, with 2,424 people.

References 

Zanjan County

Rural Districts of Zanjan Province

Populated places in Zanjan Province

Populated places in Zanjan County

fa:دهستان سهرين